Morgan Boyle (born 17 July 1996) is an Australian professional rugby league footballer who plays as a  and  forward for the Manly Warringah Sea Eagles in the NRL.

Boyle previously played for the Gold Coast Titans in the National Rugby League.

Background
Boyle was born in Bega, New South Wales, Australia. He is the son of former Canberra Raiders player David Boyle, brother of dual international Millie Boyle and nephew of Australian international Jason Croker.

Boyle played his junior rugby league for Cobargo Eels, before being signed by the Canberra Raiders.

Playing career

Early career
In 2014 and 2015, Boyle played for the Canberra Raiders' NYC team. 

In 2016, he joined the Gold Coast Titans and started playing for their NYC team.

2017
In 2017, Boyle graduated to the Titans' Queensland Cup team, Tweed Heads Seagulls. In round 6 of the 2017 NRL season, he made his NRL debut for the Titans against his former club the Raiders.

2018
In round 5 of the 2018 NRL season, Boyle scored his first NRL try for the Gold Coast in the 32-20 win over the Manly-Warringah Sea Eagles at Marley Brown Oval.

2019
Boyle made his first appearance for Manly-Warringah after leaving the Gold Coast mid-season in round 6 of the 2019 NRL season against St George, coming off the bench in a 12-10 loss at WIN Stadium.

2020
Boyle was limited to only seven matches for Manly-Warringah in the 2020 NRL season as the club missed out on the finals finishing 13th.

2021
On 5 April, it was announced that Boyle would miss the remainder of the 2021 NRL season with a shoulder injury.

2022
Boyle made only one appearance for Manly in the 2022 NRL season which was against the Sydney Roosters in round 20 of the competition.

References

External links
Manly Sea Eagles profile
Gold Coast Titans profile
Titans profile

1996 births
Living people
Australian rugby league players
Gold Coast Titans players
Manly Warringah Sea Eagles players
Rugby league players from Bega, New South Wales
Rugby league props
Rugby league second-rows
Tweed Heads Seagulls players